Saints Aerodrome,  was a temporary World War I airfield in France.  It was located  North of  Saints, in the Île-de-France region in north-central France.

Overview
The airfield was one of the many built to cope with the German offensive towards the river Marne which started in late May 1918. The first units to fly from the airfield were French "escadrilles", flying missions for the resisting French troops.

The newly operational American I Corps Observation Group arrived on 29 June with 1st Aero Squadron and 12th Aero Squadron, while 88th Aero Squadron stayed at Ourches, joining the Group later at Francheville. The stay was brief as the whole Group already moved and met together at Francheville Aerodrome, north of Coulommiers, on 6 July.

The 1st Pursuit Group moved into Saints shortly afterwards (9 July) with its four pursuit (fighter) squadrons and began flying offensive combat patrols over the Aisne-Marne Sector. From Saints, the group engaged in combat at the moment when the Allied armies were beginning to push back the German troops, a reverse move that would end with the Armistice on 11 November... As the front line was moving eastwards, the Group used Coincy Aerodrome as an advance airfield, as soon as the German flying units had left it on 1 August. By early September the front had moved quiet far from Saints and the 1st Pursuit Group moved up to Rembercourt Aerodrome to get closer to action.

As the 1st Pursuit Group moved out, the Saints Aerodrome had become useless and was abandoned, soon to be returned to agricultural use.  Today it is a series of cultivated fields located north of Saints.  The airfield was located to the north of the Départmental 15 (D15), with no indications of its  wartime use.

Known units assigned
 Headquarters, I Corps Observation Group, 29 June-6 July 1918
 1st Aero Squadron (Observation) 29 June-6 July 1918
 12th Aero Squadron (Observation) 29 June-6 July 1918
 Headquarters, 1st Pursuit Group, 9 July-1 September 1918
 27th Aero Squadron (Pursuit) 9 July-3 September 1918
 94th Aero Squadron (Pursuit) 9 July-1 September 1918
 95th Aero Squadron (Pursuit) 9 July-2 September 1918
 147th Aero Squadron (Pursuit) 9 July-1 September 1918

See also

 List of Air Service American Expeditionary Force aerodromes in France

References

 Series "D", Volume 2, Squadron histories,. Gorrell's History of the American Expeditionary Forces Air Service, 1917–1919, National Archives, Washington, D.C.

External links

World War I sites of the United States
World War I airfields in France